Jessica Hart (b. Accra, Ghana) is a British writer of over 55 romance novels in Mills & Boon. She is winner of the US RITA Award and the British RoNA Award.

Biography
Jessica Hart was born in Accra, Ghana, and grew up around Africa. She obtained a degree in French from the University of Edinburgh, Scotland, where her mother continues living. She has traveled by Tanganyika, South Africa, Papua New Guinea, Oman, Australian Outback, Kathmandu, India, Pakistan, Afghanistan, Iran, Turkey, Cameroon, Algeria, United States, Egypt, Kenya, France, Belize, Turkey, Sri Lanka, Spain, Italy, Greece… many of these countries have featured as settings in her books in one way or another.

She published her first book in 1991, and in 2004, she completed a Ph.D. on York's later medieval and early modern streets.

Jessica generally lives in York, England dividing her time between Yorkshire and Wiltshire, where her partner, John, lives.

Awards
 Christmas Eve Marriage: 2005 - Rita Award Best Novel winner by the Romance Writers of America
 Contracted: Corporate Wife: 2006 - Love Story of the Year Award by the Romantic Novelists' Association.

Bibliography

Single novels
 The Trouble with Love (1991)
 A Sweeter Prejudice (1991)
 No Mistaking Love (1992)
 Poseidon's Daughter (1992)
 Defiant Love (1993)
 Woman at Willagong Creek (1992)
 A Sensible Wife (1993)
 The Beckoning Flame (1993)
 Oasis of the Heart (1993)
 The Right Kind of Man (1994)
 Love's Labyrinth (1994)
 Moonshadow Man (1994)
 Partner for Love (1995)
 Legally Binding (1995)
 Wife to Be (1995)
 Working Girl (1996)
 Part-time Wife (1996)
 Kissing Santa (1996)
 Bride for Hire (1997)
 Birthday Bride (1998)
 Married for a Month (1999)
 The Convenient Fiancee (1999)
 The Honeymoon Prize (2002)
 Her Boss's Baby Plan (2003)
 Christmas Eve Marriage (2004)
 Mistletoe Marriage (2005)
 Her Ready-Made Family (2006)
 Marriage Reunited (2006)
 Barefoot Bride (2007)
 Outback Boss, City Bride (2007)
 Last-Minute Proposal (2008)
 Promoted: To Wife And Mother (2008)
 Newlyweds Of Convenience (2008)
 Honeymoon with the Boss (2009)
 Under the Boss's Mistletoe (2009)
 We'll Always Have Paris (2012)
 Hitched! (2012)

Outback Brides
 Outback Bride (1997)
 Outback Husband (1998)
 Baby at Bushman's Creek (2000)
 Wedding at Waverley Creek (2000)
 A Bride for Barra Creek (2001)

City Brides Series
 Fiance Wanted Fast! (2003)
 The Blind-Date Proposal (2003)
 A Whirlwind Engagemant (2003)

Bridegroom Boss
 Outback Boss, City Bride (2007)
 Appointment at the Altar (2007)

Princess Swap
 Ordinary Girl in a Tiara (2011)
 The Secret Princess (2011)

Marrying the Boss Series Multi-Author
 Temporary Engagement (1998)

Australians Series Multi-Author
 Inherited, Twins! (2001)
 The Wedding Challenge (2002)

Nine to Five Series Multi-Author
 Assignment, Baby (2001)
 Contracted: Corporate Wife (2005)
 Business Arrangement Bride (2006)

Bridegroom Boss Series
 Appointment at the Altar (2007)

Omnibus in collaboration
 Weddings Down Under (2001) (with Helen Bianchin and Margaret Way)
 City Girls (2002) (with Liz Fielding and Penny Jordan)
 All in a Day (2005) (with Carole Mortimer and Rebecca Winters)
 Here Comes the Bride (2005) (with Rebecca Winters)
 Twins Come Too! (2006) (with Marion Lennox and Sara Wood)
 Outback Proposals (2006) (with Lindsay Armstrong and Barbara Hannay)
 Wedding Vows (2007) (with Barbara Hannay and Catherine Spencer)
 Whose Baby? (2007) (with Caroline Anderson and Lucy Gordon)
 Blind-Date Grooms (2007) (with Sara Craven and Emma Darcy)

References

External links
 Jessica Hart's Webpage in Harlequin Enterprises Ltd's Website
 Jessica Hart's Webpage in Fantastic Fiction's Website

British romantic fiction writers
RITA Award winners
RoNA Award winners
Living people
British women novelists
Women romantic fiction writers
20th-century British novelists
21st-century British novelists
21st-century British women writers
20th-century British women writers
Year of birth missing (living people)